The International Conference on Microreaction Technology (IMRET) is a scientific conference series
in the field of micro process engineering and the science of microreactors.

Chronology
 IMRET 1,  Frankfurt, Germany, February 1997
 IMRET 2,  New Orleans, United States, March 1998
 IMRET 3, Frankfurt, Germany, April 1999
 IMRET 4, Atlanta, United States, March 2000
 IMRET 5,  Strasbourg, France, May 2001
 IMRET 6, New Orleans, United States, March 2002
 IMRET 7,  Lausanne, Switzerland, September 2003
 IMRET 8,  Atlanta, United States, April 2005
 IMRET 9, Potsdam, Germany, September 2006
 IMRET 10,  New Orleans, United States, April 2008
 IMRET 11,  Kyoto, Japan, March 2010
 IMRET 12,  Lyon, France, February 2012
 IMRET 13,  Budapest, Hungary, June 2014
 IMRET 14,  Beijing, China, September 2016
 IMRET 15,  Karlsruhe, Germany, October 2018

Chemical engineering organizations